Aktounta is a village in the Rethymno regional unit in Crete, Greece. Aktounta belongs to the municipal unit of Lampi, and it is 35 km away (south) from Rethymno. Population: 74 (2011). Altitude: 640 meters.

History
Aktounta's history has been extensively studied by Emmanuel Dimitrakakis and presented in the "Aktounta and its history" book.

Notable people from Aktounta
 Alekos Karavitis, Cretan music composer.
 Emmanuel Dimitrakakis, teacher and folklorer, awarded for his work by the Academy of Athens.
 Constantine Dimitrakakis, Associate Professor of Medicine, University of Athens .
 Anthony Hatzimoysis, Associate Professor of Philosophy, University of Athens .
 Vassilis Papadakis, Professor of Business Strategy, Athens University of Economics and Business .
 Georgios Smaragdakis, Professor of Cybersecurity at TU Delft .

Gallery

External links
  by Lefteri Kryovrysanaki, appeared in Rethymniotika Nea (in Greek), December 3, 2014.

Populated places in Rethymno (regional unit)